Constricting Rage of the Merciless is the sixth studio album by American blackened death metal band Goatwhore.

Release
The band announced the release of their album on March 26, 2014, during their Metal Alliance tour. To make all instruments sound better, the group recorded the album on a 2-inch tape. The producer of the band was Erik Rutan at Mana Recording Studios in St. Petersburg, Florida.

Reception

In an interview with Blabbermouth.net, Ray van Horn said that "Constricting Rage of the Merciless is so crazy fast and so stinking heavy you won't need anything else in your player for at least a week".

John Paul of PopMatters said that "Constricting Rage of the Merciless is a thrilling ride" and it is "unrelentingly pummeling and brutally oppressive".

Daniel Marsicano of Lambgoat said in his closing comments: "For those looking for music that'll make for sore necks and destructive tendencies, Constricting Rage of the Merciless will provide satisfaction".

Gregg Pratt of Exclaim! said that ""Baring Teeth for Revolt" stands out as being particularly punk rock".

Track listing

Personnel

Goatwhore
Ben Falgoust – lead vocals
Sammy Duet – guitars, backing vocals
James Harvey – bass
Zack Simmons – drums

Additional personnel
Erik Rutan – production
Jordan Barlow – artwork
Brian Ames - layout

References

2014 albums
Goatwhore albums
Metal Blade Records albums